Catoctin is a name of an Algonquian origin that refers to a number of geographical designations in the Mid-Atlantic United States.

Catoctin Mountain, part of the Blue Ridge Mountains in Maryland and Virginia
Catoctin Mountain Park, a park administered by the National Park Service in Maryland
Catoctin Quaker Camp, a summer camp on Catoctin Mountain
Catoctin Trail, a hiking trail in Maryland
Catoctin AVA, an American Viticultural Area in Maryland
Catoctin County, Virginia, a proposed county in Virginia
Catoctin Creek (Maryland), a stream in Maryland
Catoctin Creek (Virginia), a stream in Virginia
Catoctin Creek Distilling Company, a distillery in Purcellville, Loudoun County, Virginia
Catoctin District, an election district in Loudoun County, Virginia
Catoctin High School, a public high school located at the foot of Catoctin Mountain in Thurmont, Maryland
USS Catoctin (AGC-5), a ship in the United States Navy
Hi-Catoctin, original name of Camp David